The Model 43 was an entry-level four seat passenger car produced by GM's Oldsmobile Division in 1915 and 1916, then again in 1921 and 1922. It replaced the Model 42 also known as the "Baby Olds", while the most significant improvement was a longer wheelbase shared with the Buick Series C. Until GM assumed control of Chevrolet in 1917, the previous Model 42 and the Model 43 were GM's entry-level cars which led to the interrupted production of the Model 43 as Oldsmobile was promoted as a higher content product. It was also known as the "Oldsmobile Four" and competed with the Chevrolet Series H as an entry-level model until GM bought Chevrolet. It was the junior level product to the upscale Oldsmobile Light Eight. It was Oldsmobile's last four-cylinder car until 1977 with the Oldsmobile Starfire.

History 
The Model 43 was equipped with a side-valve, in-line  four-cylinder engine developing 30 bhp. One advancement that was introduced on all Oldsmobiles for 1915 was the relocation of the steering wheel to the left side of the passenger compartment and the handbrake and gearshift now centrally located inside the passenger compartment.

3,500 Model 43s were manufactured in 1915 and 1916, and due to the introduction of the Chevrolet Series 490, the Model 43 was replaced by the Oldsmobile Model 53 that had been introduced in 1913, pushing Oldsmobile upscale. Amanda Preuss drove coast to coast on the Lincoln Highway in 1916, setting a record in a Model 43. Retail prices listed were US$1,095 ($ in  dollars ) for either a touring sedan or 2-door roadster for customers who wanted something different from the Ford Model T.

In 1921 the Model 43A returned, and was marketed as a larger, more upscale entry-level model to the Chevrolet, as management noticed that removing an affordable model affected overall sales at Oldsmobile dealerships, competing for customers who were buying the Ford Model T starting in 1908. Pricing remained competitive with the touring sedan, roadster or coupe listed at US$1,325 ($ in  dollars ). The new cars had a shorter wheelbase but a larger engine than the previous Model 42. The leather cone clutch had given way to a single-disk dry clutch and, in addition to wooden spoke wheels, there were also steel disk wheels as an option. In addition to the open roadster and touring car versions, the Model 43A was also available as a 2-door coupé and 4-door sedan with a closed interior.

As Chevrolet found its place in the market as GM's entry-level product with the Chevrolet Series FA in 1917, Oldsmobile management focused on larger and more upscale cars as a junior model to Buick. In two years, 28,706 Oldsmobile Model 43As were built, making it by far the most successful model at the time.

References

Model 43
1900s cars

Brass Era vehicles
Vintage vehicles